Konyukhovskaya is a rural locality (a village) in Kalininskoye Rural Settlement, Totemsky  District, Vologda Oblast, Russia. The population was 9 as of 2002.

Geography 
Konyukhovskaya is located 31 km southwest of Totma (the district's administrative centre) by road. Slastnichikha is the nearest rural locality.

References 

Rural localities in Tarnogsky District